George Willoughby, 7th Baron Willoughby of Parham (1638–1674) was an English peer of the House of Lords.

He was born at Belvoir Castle, Leicestershire, England on 18 March 1639, the son of William Willoughby, 6th Baron Willoughby of Parham and Anne Carey. On 9 October 1666, he married Elizabeth Clinton, daughter of Henry Clinton and Jane Markham. George and Elizabeth had three children: John Willoughby, 8th Baron Willoughby of Parham, his successor; Anne, who died in infancy; and Elizabeth, who married Hon. James Bertie, son of James Bertie, 1st Earl of Abingdon. On the death of his father in 1673, he succeeded as the 7th Baron Willoughby of Parham. He died in Knaith, Lincolnshire, England in 1674, aged 35.

References

Bibliography

 .

1638 births
1674 deaths
Barons Willoughby of Parham